Anonymous Bodies in an Empty Room is the third live album by the New York City band Swans. It was recorded from shows on their The Burning World tour.

Track listing

†The second half of an unreleased song from 1988 entitled "A Young Girl Needs More". This and another song, "The Unknown", appeared only in live form during that tour.

References

External links 
 
Swans official website - Anonymous Bodies In An Empty Room

1990 live albums
Swans (band) live albums
Albums produced by Michael Gira